This is a list of organizations involved in genetics research.

Africa

Kenya
International Livestock Research Institute (ILRI), Nairobi

Namibia
The Life Technologies Conservation Genetics Laboratory (Cheetah Conservation Fund), Otjiwarongo

Asia

China
BGI Group
Chinese National Human Genome Center

India
Institute of Genomics and Integrative Biology
DNA Labs India

Iran
Royan Institute

Philippines
Philippine Genome Center

Singapore
Genome Institute of Singapore
Institute of Molecular and Cell Biology

Taiwan
National Health Research Institutes

Japan
National Institute of Genetics
Okinawa Institute of Science and Technology
RIKEN

Europe

Germany
Max Planck Institute for Molecular Genetics

Italy
Bioversity International

Sweden
Science for Life Laboratory

United Kingdom
The Genome Analysis Centre
Wellcome Sanger Institute
Wellcome Centre for Human Genetics (University of Oxford)

Russia
Research Centre for Medical Genetics (RCMG), Moscow

North America

Canada
The Centre for Applied Genomics (University of Toronto)

United States
Arizona
Translational Genomics Research Institute
California
Clear Labs
Genetic Information Research Institute
Joint Genome Institute (U.S. Department of Energy)
Salk Institute for Biological Studies
Illinois
Carl R. Woese Institute for Genomic Biology (University of Illinois, Urbana-Champaign)
Maine
The Jackson Laboratory
Maryland
Howard Hughes Medical Institute
J. Craig Venter Institute
Kennedy Krieger Institute
National Human Genome Research Institute
USC Institute Of Translational Genomics
Massachusetts
Broad Institute (Massachusetts Institute of Technology and Harvard University)
Dana–Farber Cancer Institute
Whitehead Institute for Biomedical Research (Massachusetts Institute of Technology)
Missouri
McDonnell Genome Institute (Washington University in St. Louis)
New Mexico
National Center for Genome Resources
New York
Cold Spring Harbor Laboratory
Icahn Institute for Genomics and Multiscale Biology (Icahn School of Medicine)
New York Genome Center
North Carolina
Metabolon, Inc
South Carolina
Clemson Center for Human Genetics
Greenwood Genetic Center
Texas
Human Genome Sequencing Center (Baylor College of Medicine)
Utah
ARUP Laboratories (University of Utah)

Oceania

Australia
Australian Genomics Health Alliance
Commonwealth Scientific and Industrial Research Organisation
Garvan Institute of Medical Research

South America

Brazil
Human Genome and Stem Cell Research Center (HUG-CELL), São Paulo

Genetic research watchdog organizations
GeneWatch, UK
Council for Responsible Genetics, US
Sunshine Project, Hamburg, Germany, and Austin, Texas

 
Or
Genetics research organizations, List of
Genetics